Xianfeng County is a county in the southwest of Hubei province, People's Republic of China, bordering Chongqing to the southwest. It is under the administration of the  Enshi Tujia and Miao Autonomous Prefecture.

Administrative Divisions
Six towns:
Gaoleshan, Zhongbao, Pingbaying (former Jiamachi ), Chaoyangsi, Qingping, Tangya

Four townships:
Dingzhai Township, Huolongping Township, Xiaocun Township, Huangjindong Township

One other area:
Daluba Zone

Climate

References

 
Counties of Hubei
Enshi Tujia and Miao Autonomous Prefecture